Jean Claude Marc Raymond  (born May 7, 1937) is a former pitcher for the Chicago White Sox (1959), Milwaukee/Atlanta Braves (1961–63, 1967–69), Houston Colt .45's/Astros (1964–67) and Montreal Expos (1969–71). 

He was one of the few baseball players to wear glasses during that era and as he came from the province of Quebec was nicknamed "Frenchy".

Playing career
Raymond pitched in three games for Chicago in early 1959. Although he was traded from the National League West-leading Atlanta Braves to the expansion Montreal Expos in 1969, Raymond remarked this was one of the happiest moments of his life as he was able to play for his home province.

In 12 seasons he compiled a 46–53 record, appeared in 449 games, started 7 games, recorded 2 complete games, 270 games finished, 83 saves, 721 innings pitched, 711 hits allowed, 338 runs allowed, 293 earned runs allowed, 75 home runs allowed, 225 walks allowed, 497 strikeouts, 28 hit batsmen, 32 wild pitches, 3,048 batters faced, 54 intentional walks, 4 balks and a 3.66 ERA.

Post-playing career
After his playing career, Raymond worked as a French-language broadcaster with the Expos from 1972 to 2001. 

During the 1996 Summer Olympics in Atlanta, Raymond was the public address announcer for baseball. The International Olympic Committee required that announcements at Olympic venues must also be made in French, which made Raymond, who had previously pitched in Atlanta, well-suited for the job. 

He was also an Expos English-language broadcaster in 2004, their last season in Montreal.

Raymond joined the Expos staff as a roving coach in 2002 and served until the team left Montreal after the 2004 campaign to become the Washington Nationals.

Honours and awards
Raymond was named to the 1966 National League All-Star Team. Raymond was inducted into the Canadian Baseball Hall of Fame in 1984, in its second year of operation.

In June 2019 Raymond was appointed a Member of the Order of Canada.

References

External links

 Canada Sports Hall of Fame

1937 births
Atlanta Braves players
Atlanta Crackers players
Baseball people from Quebec
Canadian Baseball Hall of Fame inductees
Canadian expatriate baseball players in the United States
Chicago White Sox players
Evansville Braves players
Houston Astros players
Houston Colt .45s players
Jacksonville Braves players
Living people
Louisville Colonels (minor league) players
Major League Baseball broadcasters
Major League Baseball pitchers
Major League Baseball players from Canada
Members of the Order of Canada
Milwaukee Braves players
Montreal Expos announcers
Montreal Expos coaches
Montreal Expos players
National League All-Stars
People from Saint-Jean-sur-Richelieu
Sacramento Solons players
Toronto Maple Leafs (International League) players
Vancouver Mounties players
West Palm Beach Indians players
Wichita Braves players